The Order of Sport Merit is one of the Republic of Korea's (South Korea) Orders of Merit. It is awarded to those who have rendered outstanding meritorious services in the interest of improving citizen's physique and national status through sports.

Classes of Sport Merit
The Order of Sport Merit is conferred in five classes: 
  Cheongnyong (Blue Dragon) 청룡장 
  Maengho (Fierce Tiger) 맹호장 
  Geosang (Giant Elephant) 거상장
  Baengma (White Horse) 백마장
  Girin (Giraffe) 기린장

Other Orders of Merit
There are three kinds of decoration awarded by the Republic of Korea. They are Orders, Medals of Merit, and Service Medals.

Selected recipients

Cheongnyong Medal 
 Prince Philip, Duke of Edinburgh - During the Prince's 1985 visit to Seoul, then-President Chun Doo-hwan presented him with the award for his long-time role as President of the International Federation for Equestrian Sports.
 Guus Hiddink - Dutch football coach who coached the South Korean men's football team to a historic fourth-place at the 2002 FIFA World Cup.
 Kim Yun-a - retired South Korean figure skater and gold medalist at the Winter Olympics and World Championships
 Jang Mi-ran -  South Korean Olympic weightlifter and gold medalist at the 2008 Summer Olympics
 Lee Bong-ju - South Korean marathoner and silver medalist at the 1996 Summer Olympics
 Thomas Bach - IOC President
 Kim Jung-hwan - first South Korean fencer to medal at three consecutive Olympics
 Won Woo-young - first Asian fencer to win an individual gold medal in men's sabre at the World Fencing Championships and team gold medalist at the 2012 Summer Olympics
 Son Heung-min - footballer for Tottenham Hotspur and the South Korean national team. First Asian player to win the Premier League Golden Boot.

References

External links
 체육훈장(體育勳章, Order of Sport Merit)</u>.
 Republic of Korea's Orders of Merit

Orders, decorations, and medals of South Korea
South Korean sports trophies and awards